The Borribles: Across the Dark Metropolis is the third volume of the Borrible Trilogy, written by Michael de Larrabeiti and first published in 1986 by Piccolo Books in the United Kingdom.

The book is currently available in the UK as part of The Borrible Trilogy, which was reissued in one trade paperback volume in 2002 by Pan Macmillan and in paperback by Tor UK in 2003. In the United States the book is currently available as an individual volume, published by Tor in 2005.

Plot summary
Borribles are runaway children whose ears become pointed as they take to the streets, indicators of their independence and intelligence. As long as their ears remain unclipped they will never age; for this reason, they wear woollen hats pulled low over their ears in order to remain undetected by the authorities, who find their freedom threatening to the social order. Borribles are skinny, scruffy, and tough; they have nothing to do with money, and steal what they need to survive.

In The Borriles: Across the Dark Metropolis, the third book in The Borrible Trilogy, Battersea is no longer safe for a Borrible. The SBG, a section of the London police driven on by the fanatical Inspector Sussworth and dedicated to finding Borribles and clipping their ears is determined to wipe them out. The Borribles decide to escort Sam the horse to safety in Neasden and then return to the old way of life of independence and freedom. They begin their journey Across the Dark Metropolis, a journey that tests the courage and cunning of the Adventurers to the limits.

Film adaptation
While a July 2004 report in Variety revealed that a film based on the entire trilogy was being developed by CUBA Pictures, the film development arm of literary agents Curtis Brown,  no such film can be found at IMDb, Variety Insight, nor other such online databases of information related to films.

References
de Larrabeiti, Michael. The Borrible Trilogy. (London: Tor, 2003). UK edition - 
de Larrabeiti, Michael. The Borribles: Across the Dark Metropolis. (Tor, 2005). US Edition -

Reception
David Langford reviewed The Borribles: Across the Dark Metropolis in the December 1986 issue of White Dwarf, stating:

Reviews
Review by Faren Miller (1987) in Locus, #315 April 1987

See also
The Borrible Trilogy
The Borribles Go For Broke: the second volume in The Borrible Trilogy

References

External links
Free PDF of the first chapter of The Borribles: Across the Dark Metropolis
michaeldelarrabeiti.com - Michael de Larrabeiti's official website

1986 British novels
Books by Michael de Larrabeiti
British fantasy novels
Pan Books books